Walker Dwayne Russell Jr. (born October 6, 1982) is an American former professional basketball point guard. A native of Pontiac, Michigan, he played college basketball for Chipola College and Jacksonville State University.

Professional career

2006–07 season
After going undrafted in the 2006 NBA draft, Russell joined the New York Knicks for the 2006 NBA Summer League. He later signed with ČEZ Nymburk of the Czech Republic for the 2006–07 season. In February 2007, he left Nymburk and joined the Fort Worth Flyers the following month.

2007–08 season
In July 2007, Russell joined the Detroit Pistons for the 2007 NBA Summer League. On October 1, 2007, he signed with the New York Knicks but he was later waived on October 25. In November 2007, he joined the Fort Wayne Mad Ants where he played 17 games before leaving the club in January 2008 to sign with MMT Estudiantes Madrid of Spain for the rest of the season.

2008–09 season
In November 2008, Russell returned to the Fort Wayne Mad Ants where he went on to average 16.1 points and 10.8 assists per game in 2008–09.

2009–10 season
In July 2009, Russell joined the NBA D-League Select team for the 2009 NBA Summer League. He later signed with Lukoil Academic of Bulgaria for the 2009–10 season but was later released in January 2010 after appearing in 10 games.

In February 2010, he joined Piratas de Quebradillas for the 2010 BSN season but was released by the club in March after just seven games.

2010–11 season
On August 6, 2010, Russell signed with the Gießen 46ers of Germany for the 2010–11 season. He was later released by the club before appearing in a game for them.

On October 30, 2010, he was reacquired by the Fort Wayne Mad Ants and went on to play 37 games for the club in 2010–11. On February 28, 2011, he terminated his contract with Fort Wayne and signed with the Zhejiang Lions for the 2011 CBA playoffs.

2011–12 season
In July 2011, Russell joined Leones de Santo Domingo for the 2011 LNB season. He went on to help Leones win the 2011 championship.

After starting the 2011–12 season with the Fort Wayne Mad Ants, Russell signed with the Detroit Pistons on December 12 following the conclusion of the NBA lockout. However, he was later waived by the Pistons on December 21 and returned to Fort Wayne. Then, on January 20, Russell re-signed with the Pistons for the rest of the season.

2012–13 season
In July 2012, Russell joined the New York Knicks for the 2012 NBA Summer League. On October 1, 2012, he signed with the Oklahoma City Thunder. However, he was later waived by the Thunder on October 22, 2012. In November 2012, he was once again reacquired by the Mad Ants. On December 27, 2012, he was traded to the Reno Bighorns. On April 19, 2013, he signed with Cocodrilos de Caracas of Venezuela.

2013–14 season
In July 2013, Russell re-joined Leones de Santo Domingo of the Liga Nacional de Baloncesto.

On September 1, 2013, he signed a one-month contract with Galatasaray of the Turkish Basketball League. He left the club following his contract's expiration before playing in a game for them. On February 27, 2014, he was reacquired by the Reno Bighorns.

In May 2014, he signed with Leones de Santo Domingo for the 2014 season, returning to the club for a third stint.

2014–15 season
On October 2, 2014, Russell signed with Apollon Limassol of the Cyprus Basketball Division 1. After appearing in just one game on November 2, he left Apollon and returned to the United States. On December 23, he was acquired by the Westchester Knicks. In May, 2015, he returned with Leones de Santo Domingo.

Personal life
Russell is the son of former NBA player, Walker Russell Sr., who played six seasons in the NBA during the 1980s. Both father and son started their NBA career with the Pistons. Russell's first son, Aiden Jake, was born on February 25, 2012.

References

External links
Eurobasket.com Profile
NBA D-League Profile

1982 births
Living people
American expatriate basketball people in Bulgaria
American expatriate basketball people in China
American expatriate basketball people in Cyprus
American expatriate basketball people in the Czech Republic
American expatriate basketball people in the Dominican Republic
American expatriate basketball people in Spain
American expatriate basketball people in Venezuela
American men's basketball players
Apollon Limassol BC players
Basketball players from Michigan
CB Estudiantes players
Basketball Nymburk players
Chipola Indians men's basketball players
Cocodrilos de Caracas players
Detroit Pistons players
Fort Wayne Mad Ants players
Fort Worth Flyers players
Galatasaray S.K. (men's basketball) players
Jacksonville State Gamecocks men's basketball players
Liga ACB players
Piratas de Quebradillas players
Point guards
Reno Bighorns players
Sportspeople from Pontiac, Michigan
Undrafted National Basketball Association players
Westchester Knicks players
Zhejiang Lions players